Mihály Simai (born 1930, in Budapest) is a noted Hungarian economist, researcher at the Institute for World Economics, Research Centre for Economic and Regional Studies of the Hungarian Academy of Sciences and professor at Corvinus University. His main area of specialization is world economics and the transformation of the world economic system. Previous posts include his directorship of the World Institute for Development Economics Research, Helsinki between 1993-1995, membership and presidency of the United Nations University Council between 1987-1993, directorship of the Institute for World Economics, Hungarian Academy of Sciences between 1987-1991, and vice-chairmanship of the UNICEF Governing Council between 1979-1985.

Membership 
 Member of the Hungarian Academy of Sciences
 Honorary President of the World Federation of United Nations Associations

Awards 
 UN Meritorious Service Award (1995)
 Széchenyi Prize (2007)

Selected publications 
 Simai, Mihály (1994) The future of global governance: managing risk and change in the international system, US Institute of Peace Press
 Simai, Mihály (ed.) (1999, 2007) The Democratic Process and the Market: Challenges of the Transition, Tokyo: United Nations University Press 
 Simai, Mihaly (2001) The Age of Global Transformations: the Human Dimension, Budapest: Akadémiai Kiadó

References 

Hungarian economists
1930 births
Living people
Academic staff of the Corvinus University of Budapest